= Pattihal (K.B.) =

- Village
- Country: India
- State: Karnataka
- District: Belgaum

Languages
  - Official: Kannada ಪಟ್ಟಿಹಾಳ (ಕೆ.ಬಿ)
- Time zone: UTC+5:30 (IST)
- Postal code: 591104

Pattihal (K.B.) is a village in Belgaum district of Karnataka, India.
